The 2002 SWAC men's basketball tournament was held March 5–9, 2002, at Bill Harris Arena in Birmingham, Alabama.  defeated , 70–67 in the championship game. The Braves received the conference's automatic bid to the 2002 NCAA tournament as one of two No. 16 seeds in the East Region.

Bracket and results

References

2001–02 Southwestern Athletic Conference men's basketball season
SWAC men's basketball tournament